The Guardians of the Galaxy are a fictional superhero team that has starred in the comic book series of the same name, published by Marvel Comics. The original team, based in an alternate universe within the Marvel Comics continuity, debuted in the comic book Marvel Super-Heroes #18 (January 1969). Another team, this time based in the mainstream Marvel Universe, debuted in the comic Guardians of the Galaxy (vol. 2) #1 (May 2008).

Original team 
These are the members of the original, Earth-691 Guardians of the Galaxy team.

Galactic Guardians

Modern team 
These are the members of the mainstream Marvel Universe Guardians of the Galaxy team. They are separated by the period when they joined.
 Characters in bold are members of the team as of the present time.
 Characters listed are set in the Earth-616 continuity except when noted.

Marvel NOW!

All New All Different Marvel

Dark Guardians

Fresh Start

Marvel Cinematic Universe 
 A version of the Guardians of the Galaxy exists in the Marvel Cinematic Universe.
 Characters listed in bold are members of the team as of the present

Ravagers 
Guardians of the Galaxy Vol. 2 (2017) also features a version of the original team, later known the Ravagers.

Notes

References 

Lists of Marvel Comics characters by organization
Members